Professor Melissa Anne Wake MBChB MD FRACP FAHMS is a paediatrician and Scientific Director of the Generation Victoria initiative, aiming to create very large, parallel whole-of-state birth and parent cohorts in Victoria, Australia, for Open Science discovery and interventional research. She is Group Leader of the Murdoch Children's Research Institute’s Prevention Innovation Research Group and holds Professorial positions with the University of Melbourne and the University of Auckland (the Liggins Institute).

Her "population paediatrics" research spans common childhood conditions and antecedents of diseases of ageing. She leads the Longitudinal Study of Australian Children's biophysical repository (the Child Health CheckPoint) and has led/co-led 20 community-based randomised trials. A major focus is on building large-scale platforms to support faster, better observational and interventional children’s research.

Early Life and Education

Melissa Wake was born in Levin, New Zealand, the youngest of five children. After leaving Woodford House School for Girls in 1976, she graduated in medicine from the University of Otago in 1982, and entered clinical paediatrics in England before formal training in Auckland and Melbourne. Following her research doctorate (1999), she was Director of Research at Melbourne's Centre for Community Child Health and a consultant paediatrician at Melbourne Royal Children's Hospital. In 2017, she took up the Chair in Child Health Research at the University of Auckland, later returning to Melbourne to lead the foundational stages of Generation Victoria.

Awards 

 2019 National Health and Medical Research Council Principal Research Fellowship
 2015	Australian Academy of Health and Medical Sciences Foundation Elected Fellow
 2013	National Health and Medical Research Council Elizabeth Blackburn Fellow] – highest-ranked Public Health Research Fellowship to a female applicant
 2013	Murdoch Children's Research Institute Director's Award for Outstanding Achievement
 2012	National Health and Medical Research Council – Excellence Award – Highest-ranked Research Fellowship
 2010	Victorian Government Early Years Minister’s Award: Improving Infant Sleep Patterns and Maternal Mental Health
 2009	Australian Health Minister’s Award for Excellence in Health and Medical Research
 2009	National Health and Medical Research Council – Population Health Career Development Award Level 2
 2008	National Health and Medical Research Council – Excellence Award for top-ranked Career Development Award in Public Health
 2008, 2016 NHMRC "Ten of the Best" publication

Highlighted Publications 

Wake (ORCiD: 0000-0001-7501-9257) is one of Australia’s foremost population researchers, publishing nearly 400 articles in top general and discipline journals. Publications include:

Randomised and quasi-experimental trials
 Roberts G, … Wake M. Academic Outcomes 2 Years after working memory training for children with low working memory: A randomized clinical trial. JAMA Pediatrics 2016;170(5):e154568
 Wake M, Ching T, et al. Population outcomes of three approaches to detection of congenital hearing loss. Pediatrics 2016;137(1):e20151722
 Sung V, … Wake M. Treating infant colic with the probiotic Lactobacillus reuteri: Double blind, placebo controlled randomised trial. BMJ 2014;348:g2107
 Wake M, Lycett K, et al. Shared care obesity management in 3-10 year old children: 12 month outcomes of HopSCOTCH randomised trial. BMJ 2013;346:f3092
 Wake M, Tobin S, et al. Outcomes of population based language promotion for slow to talk toddlers at ages 2 and 3 years: Let's Learn Language cluster randomised controlled trial. BMJ 2011;343:d4741.
 Wake M, Baur L, et al. Outcomes and costs of primary care surveillance and intervention for overweight or obese children: the LEAP 2 randomised controlled trial. BMJ 2009;339(32):b3308
 Hiscock H, Wake M. Randomised controlled trial of behavioural infant sleep intervention to improve infant sleep and maternal mood. BMJ 2002;324:1062

Data resources and cohort research
 Wake M, Goldfeld S, Davidson A. Embedding Life Course Interventions in Longitudinal Cohort Studies: Australia’s GenV Opportunity. Pediatrics 2022 May 1;149(Suppl 5):e2021053509R
 Hu Y, Wake M, Saffery R. Clarifying the Sweeping Consequences of COVID-19 in Pregnant Women, Newborns, and Children with Existing Cohorts. JAMA Pediatrics 2021 Feb 1;175(2):117-118
 Clifford SA, … Wake M. Child Health CheckPoint: Cohort summary of a physical health and biospecimen module for the Longitudinal Study of Australian Children. BMJ Open 2019; 4;9(Suppl 3):3-22
 Williams J, Wake M, et al. Health-related quality of life of overweight and obese children.  JAMA 2005;293(1):70-76
 Wake M, Hesketh K, Lucas J. Teething and tooth eruption in infants: A cohort study. Pediatrics 2000;106:1374-1379

References

External links
 

Living people
New Zealand women academics
Year of birth missing (living people)
Academic staff of the University of Melbourne
University of Melbourne alumni
Academic staff of the University of Auckland
New Zealand paediatricians
New Zealand medical researchers
Fellows of the Australian Academy of Health and Medical Sciences